Tommy Dwyer is an Irish sportsperson.  He plays hurling with his local club Ferns St Aidan's and has been a member of the Wexford senior hurling team since 2008.

References

Living people
Year of birth missing (living people)
Ferns St Aidan's hurlers
People from Ferns
Wexford inter-county hurlers